Origin of Muse is a box set by the English rock band Muse, released on 6 December 2019 through Muse's Helium 3 label and Warner Records. It includes remastered editions of Muse's first two albums, Showbiz (1999) and Origin of Symmetry (2001), as well as B-sides, demos, and live performances from their early career. In total, the box set includes 113 tracks, nine CDs, and four vinyl records.

Contents
The box set is a 48-page book housed inside of a slipcase. The book contains a total of nine CDs and four heavyweight, colored vinyl records. The band's debut studio album, Showbiz (1999), as well as their second release, Origin of Symmetry (2001), were remastered for the release. The two albums each have two vinyl records as well as corresponding CD copies in the box.

The rest of the box contains the demo albums Newton Abbot Demos, The Muse EPs + Showbiz Demos, and Origin of Symmetry Instrumental Demos. The B-sides released during the respective eras of Showbiz and Origin of Symmetry each have their own CDs. A compilation of Showbiz-era tracks performed live are included on a CD, while a performance of the entire Origin of Symmetry album during the 2011 Reading Festival is on another.

Outside of music, the book features an in-depth interview with the band regarding their beginnings and the recording sessions for their first two albums. It also includes concert setlists, photos, and posters from those eras. The collection contains a total of 113 tracks, with 40 previously unreleased.

Track listings (CD)

Track listings (vinyl)

Showbiz (Remastered)

Origin of Symmetry (Remastered)

Charts

References

External links
 
 

Muse (band) albums
Warner Records compilation albums
2019 compilation albums